Engen Petroleum is a South African oil company focusing on the downstream refined petroleum products market and related businesses. The company’s core functions are the refining of crude oil, the marketing of primary refined petroleum products and the provision of convenience services via an extensive retail network. Until 1990, it was part of Mobil. In 1993, it changed the brand name to Engen. The company is present in 17 countries and exports products to over 30 more countries, mostly in Africa and the Indian Ocean Islands.

A number of Engen's service stations are operated on a franchise basis. Engen operates its own transport fleet with approximately 180 bulk fuel tankers.

Today, Engen Petroleum is active in South Africa, Botswana, Namibia, Zimbabwe, Mozambique, Kenya, Ghana, Gabon, Tanzania, Rwanda, Zambia, Malawi, Lesotho, Eswatini, Mauritius, Réunion and The Democratic Republic of the Congo.  The company is also listed on the  Botswana Stock Exchange and is a constituent of the BSE Domestic Company Index.

Ownership 
 Until 1990 Mobil South Africa
 1990-1996 Gencor 
 1996 30% PETRONAS
 1998 100% PETRONAS
 1998-2017 80% PETRONAS and 20% Phembani Group
 Today 74% PETRONAS, 20% Phembani Group and 6% Phembani-led Consortium

Websites 
 http://www.engen.co.za Engen Petroleum
 http://www.engenoil.com Engen Africa (outside South Africa)

References 

Companies based in Cape Town
Companies listed on the Johannesburg Stock Exchange
Oil and gas companies of South Africa
Multinational oil companies